The 1985–86 OHL season was the sixth season of the Ontario Hockey League. Fifteen teams each played 66 games. The Guelph Platers won the J. Ross Robertson Cup, defeating the Belleville Bulls.

New Arena

Copps Coliseum (Hamilton)
The Hamilton Steelhawks moved from the Mountain Arena to Copps Coliseum early in the season.

Regular season

Final standings
Note: GP = Games played; W = Wins; L = Losses; T = Ties; GF = Goals for; GA = Goals against; PTS = Points; x = clinched playoff berth; y = clinched division title

Leyden Division

Emms Division

Scoring leaders

Playoffs

Division quarter-finals

Leyden Division

(1) Peterborough Petes vs. (6) Toronto Marlboros

(2) Belleville Bulls vs. (5) Cornwall Royals

(3) Oshawa Generals vs. (4) Kingston Canadians

Emms Division

(1) North Bay Centennials vs. (6) London Knights

(2) Guelph Platers vs. (5) Sudbury Wolves

(3) Windsor Compuware Spitfires vs. (4) Kitchener Rangers

Division semi-finals

Leyden Division

Round-Robin

Emms Division

Round-Robin

Division finals

Leyden Division

(1) Peterborough Petes vs. (2) Belleville Bulls

Emms Division

(2) Guelph Platers vs. (3) Windsor Compuware Spitfires

J. Ross Robertson Cup

(E2) Guelph Platers vs. (L2) Belleville Bulls

Awards

1986 OHL Priority Selection
The Sault Ste. Marie Greyhounds held the first overall pick in the 1986 Ontario Priority Selection and selected Troy Mallette from the Rayside-Balfour Midgets. Mallette was awarded the Jack Ferguson Award, awarded to the top pick in the draft.

Below are the players who were selected in the first round of the 1986 Ontario Hockey League Priority Selection.

See also
List of OHA Junior A standings
List of OHL seasons
1986 Memorial Cup
1986 NHL Entry Draft
1985 in sports
1986 in sports

References

HockeyDB

Ontario Hockey League seasons
OHL